Go-Ahead Transport Services (Dublin) Limited, known as Go-Ahead Ireland is a bus operator in Dublin that commenced trading in September 2018. It is a subsidiary of the Go-Ahead Group.

History 
With the aim of improving efficiency, in 2015 the National Transport Authority put the operation of 24 Dublin Bus routes out to tender. In August 2017 the contract was awarded to the Go-Ahead Group. This represented 10% of the incumbent operator Dublin Bus existing monopoly operated network.

Go-Ahead Ireland commenced operating one new route, 175 from Citywest to University College Dublin, on 9 September 2018. A further four transferred from Dublin Bus on 7 October, then another three on 21 October, four on 2 December, nine on 20 January 2019 and a final three transferred on 24 March 2019. By this time the fleet had grown to 125 buses after taking over all the services that the company was scheduled to commence operation on. The contract is for five years with an option for a two-year extension.

On 26 July 2019 a second depot was opened in Naas in County Kildare. This depot is being used to manage a number of Dublin commuter coach routes which the company won the tender to operate, formerly operated by Bus Éireann, which were transferred to Go-Ahead between December 2019 and January 2020.

Routes

Dublin routes

Dublin Commuter routes 
Go-Ahead Ireland took over the operation of a further six routes from Dublin to Offaly, Laois, Kildare and Meath from Bus Éireann between December 2019 and January 2020.
These are the 120, 120C, 123, 124, 126 and the 130. They started operating the 126 and 130 on 1 December 2019 which coincided with the introduction of new route 125 from Newbridge to UCD. They took over the 120 and 120C on 19 January 2020.

Route 197 
On 24 November 2019, Go-Ahead Ireland started operating route 197. This route is part of a separate contract with the NTA. It uses Alexander Dennis Enviro 200MMCs owned by Go-Ahead rather than the NTA as is the case on the Dublin city and commuter routes.

Fleet 
Go-Ahead Ireland commenced operations with nine buses. By the time it took over its final routes from Dublin Bus in early 2019, the fleet was scheduled to expand to 125 buses comprising 24 new Wright Gemini 3 bodied Volvo B5TLs and 40 Wright StreetLites, with 12 Wright Gemini 2 bodied Volvo B9TLs and 49 Wright Gemini 3 bodied Volvo B5TLs to transfer from Dublin Bus. It was later decided that an extra 12 double decker buses were required in order to be able to fulfill the full quantity of routes due to transfer. These buses were diverted from an order of Wright Gemini 3 Volvo B5TL buses originally meant for Dublin Bus bringing the fleet up to 133 buses. In 2022 Go-Ahead Ireland received 3 more Wright Gemini 3 Volvo B5TL buses from Dublin Bus and were numbered 11601 to 11603. These were former SG272, SG273 and SG275 of Dublin Bus Broadstone Depot. Go-Ahead Ireland use five digit and six digit numbers for fleet numbering with their 96 B5TLs being numbered from 11501 to 11593 and 11601 to 11603, 12 B9TLs are numbered from 11901 to 11912 and the 40 Streetlites are numbered between 12101 and 12140. 9 former Dublin Bus AX class Volvo B7TL buses with Alexander ALX400 bodywork have been added to the fleet as additional buses. These were numbered 11701 to 11709 and were new to Dublin Bus as AX497 to AX505.  Ten Mercedes-Benz Citaros and five Wright Gemini bodied Volvo B7TLs were transferred from Oxford Bus Company and Go-Ahead London as driver trainers. In March 2022 they received 3 former B5LH Wright Gemini 2 vehicles from Go-Ahead London also for driver training. These are numbered 8501 to 8503. In 2022 Go-Ahead took delivery of 3 Wright Streetlite's numbered 12141 to 12143. These vehicles are formerly owned by Metrobus in the UK and have replaced Enviro200MMC's numbered 2701 to 2703 on route 197 between Ashbourne and Swords. The 3 Enviro200MMC's were sold to Metrobus in exchange for the Streetlites. 

The Dublin Commuter routes are operated by a mixture of double deck VDL Futura coaches and Sunsundegui SB3 bodied Volvo B8R interurban buses.

Go-Ahead Ireland's Dublin City fleet is managed from its primary depot on the site of a former DHL Express depot in Ballymount. A second depot in Naas where the Commuter routes are based opened on 26 July 2019.

In August 2020 Go-Ahead Ireland began operation of 8 new routes in North and West County Dublin. The fleet they use on these routes are eight Ex- Dublin Bus 2006 ALX 400 class buses formerly AX497-505 now they are numbered 11701-11709. They are currently operating on route 33S,102A/C/P/S,220S,236S&270S

References 

Bus transport in the Republic of Ireland
Go-Ahead Group companies
Transport companies established in 2018
2018 establishments in Ireland